The following is a list of notable people who have been born or lived in Indianapolis, Indiana. Organized alphabetically by field of study and then by last name.

Actors 
 Abraham Benrubi (1969– ), actor, best known for ER and Parker Lewis Can't Lose
 Monte Blue (1887–1963), silent film/character actor
 Connie Booth (1944– ), actress, screenwriter
 Steve Burton (1970– ), television actor
 Joyce DeWitt (1949– ), actress, best known for Three's Company
 Cullen Douglas (1967– ), actor, producer, director, best known for Grey’s Anatomy and Pure Genius
 Robert Emhardt (1914–1994), Actor
 Mike Epps (1970– ), stand6up comedian, actor, producer, writer, rapper
 Frances Farmer (1913–1970), actress
 Rhett Fisher (1980– ), actor, best known for Power Rangers: Lightspeed Rescue
 Brendan Fraser (1968– ), film actor
 Ken Foree (1948– ), actor 
 Vivica A. Fox ( actress
 Doug Jones (1960– ), actor
 Brook Kerr (1973– ), actress
 Forrest Landis (1994– ), actor
 Priscilla Lawson (1914–1958), actress
 Marjorie Main (1890–1975), actress
 Steve McQueen (1930–1980), Academy Award-nominated actor
 Julie McWhirter (1947– ), actress
 Margo Moore (1931–2000), actress
 Dohn Norwood(1974– ) actor, Hell on Wheels (TV series)
 Dayo Okeniyi (1988– ), film actor
 Jake Short (1997– ), actor
 Steve Talley (1981– ), television/film actor
 Harry von Zell (1906–1981), television/film actor and radio announcer, best known for The George Burns and Gracie Allen Show
 Clifton Webb (1889–1966), stage/film actor
 Sasheer Zamata (1986– ), comedian, actress, former cast member on Saturday Night Live

Artists 
 Vija Celmins (1938– ), visual artist
 Don Gummer, artist
 John Wesley Hardrick (1891–1968), artist
 Ron McQueeney, photographer
 Wilhelmina Seegmiller (1866–1913), author, illustrator, art teacher
Sheida Soleimani (1990–), contemporary artist, born in Indianapolis.
 Jeremy Spencer, musician (1973– )

Athletes 

Donie Bush (1887–1972), Major League Baseball (MLB) player/manager
George Bailey (1900–1940), IndyCar Series driver
Bryce Campbell (1994– ), plays for the United States national rugby union team
Rodney Carney (1984– ), National Basketball Association (NBA) player
Oscar Charleston (1896–1954), baseball player, member of Baseball Hall of Fame
Mike Conley Jr. (1987– ), NBA player
Hooks Dauss (1889–1963), MLB player
Euphrasia Donnelly (1905–1963), swimmer, Olympic gold medalist (1924)
Stu Douglass (1990– ), American-Israeli basketball player for the Israeli team Maccabi Ashdod
Jack Doyle (1990– ), National Football League (NFL) tight end
Jeff George (1967– ), NFL quarterback
Eric Gordon (1988– ), NBA player
Greg Graham (1970– ), NBA player
Marcellus Greene (1957– ), NFL player
Gordon Hayward (1990– ), NBA player
Alan Henderson (1972– ), NBA player
John F. Hennessey (1900–1981), tennis player (1920s)
Oral Hildebrand (1907–1977), MLB All-Star pitcher
George Hill (1986– ), NBA player
Lauren Holiday (1987– ), US Women's National Soccer player, Olympic gold medalist, 2015 Women's World Cup champion
Lester Horton (1906–1953), dancer and choreographer 
 Tommy Hunter (1986– ), Major League baseball pitcher for Philadelphia Phillies
Kenny Irwin (1969–2000), NASCAR driver
Jack Johnson (1987– ) NHL player
Mathias Kiwanuka (1983– ), NFL player
Ken Klee (1971– ), National Hockey League (NHL) player
Chuck Klein (1904–1958), MLB player
Kyle Krisiloff (1986– ), NASCAR driver
Shawn Langdon (2007– ), Current NHRA Funny Car Driver 2013 Top Fuel Champion 2 Time Super Comp Champion
Brad Leaf (1960–), American-Israeli basketball player for Hapoel Galil Elyon and Maccabi Tel Aviv of the Israel Premier League 
Courtney Lee (1985– ), NBA player
Don Leppert (1931– ), MLB player
Lori Lindsey (1980– ), U.S. Women's National Soccer player, Olympic gold medalist
Zack Martin (1990– ), NFL player
George McGinnis (1950– ), NBA player
Frank McKinney (1938–1992), diver, Olympic gold medalist (1960), banking executive
Terry McLaurin Ohio State Buckeyes and Washington Redskins wide receiver
Eric Montross (1971– ), NBA player
Greg Oden (1988– ), NBA player
Austin Price (born 1995), basketball player in the Israeli Premier Basketball League
Derrick Ransom (1976– ), National Football League (NFL) player defensive tackle
Matt Reiswerg (born 1980), soccer player, coach, and administrator
Oscar Robertson (1938– ), basketball player, member of Basketball Hall of Fame 
Sally Schantz, figure skater, U.S. ice dancing champion (1963)
Judy Schwomeyer (1950– ), figure skater, U.S. ice dancing champion (1968–72)
Sandra Spuzich (1937–2015), LPGA pro golfer
Brad Stevens (1976– ), President of Basketball Operations and former head coach of the Boston Celtics
Major Taylor (1878–1932), cyclist
Jeff Teague (1988– ), NBA player
Johnny Weaver (1935–2008), pro wrestler, first to use the sleeper hold "Weaver Lock"
Randy Wittman (1959– ), NBA head coach
Greg Wojciechowski (1951– ), wrestler
Sean Woods (1970– ), college basketball coach
T. J. Yates (1987–), former quarterback who is currently the wide receivers coach for the Atlanta Falcons

Business and philanthropy 

 Steve Bellamy, sports media entrepreneur, founder of The Ski Channel and The Tennis Channel
 Steve Ells, founder, CEO of Chipotle Mexican Grill
 Scott Flanders, businessman and former CEO of Playboy, Inc.
 John Geisse, businessman, founder of Target Stores
 Bob Glenalvin, first manager of Detroit Tigers
Sid Grauman, founder of Grauman's Chinese Theatre in Hollywood, former home of the Academy Awards
Scott A. Jones, co-founder of ChaCha
 Eli Lilly, founder, president of pharmaceutical company Eli Lilly and Company
Josiah K. Lilly, Sr., president of pharmaceutical company Eli Lilly and Company
Ruth Lilly, philanthropist
Kim Ng, Major League Baseball executive
Freeman Ransom, lawyer, businessman, civic leader
Henry J. Richardson Jr., lawyer and civil rights activist, member of the Indiana House of Representatives (1932–36), and a judge in Marion County, Indiana.
Madam C.J. Walker, pioneering African-American businesswoman, first female self-made millionaire in America
Margaret Ray Wickens (1843–1918), organizer and social reformer

Entertainment 

 Rupert Boneham, reality show contestant, Survivor: Pearl Islands, Survivor: All-Stars, Survivor: Heroes vs. Villains, "Survivor: Blood vs. Water; politician
 June Cochran, model, Miss Indiana USA 1960, Playboy magazine's Playmate of the Year 1963
 Ken Hixon, screenwriter
 David Letterman, television personality, former host of The Late Show (1993–2015)
 Ryan Murphy, film and television screenwriter, director, and producer, notably Nip/Tuck, 'American Horror Story and Glee
 Blair St. Clair (Andrew Bryson), drag performer
 Marc Summers, game show host, television personality
 Dan Wakefield, screenwriter, novelist
 Marjorie Wallace, Miss World 1973

Journalists and media 
 Roy Blount, Jr., journalist, author
Scott Evans, television personality
 Louis McHenry Howe, reporter for the New York Herald, political advisor to President Franklin D. Roosevelt
 Jack Olsen, journalist and author
Jane Pauley, television personality, journalist
Myrta Pulliam, Pulitzer Prize-winning journalist

Military 
 Thomas A. Morris, railroad executive, civil engineer, Union General in the Civil War
 Norris W. Overton, U.S. Air Force Brigadier General
 Raymond A. Spruance, commander of the U.S. Fifth Fleet (1944–1945)

Musicians 
Mark Battles, rapper-songwriter, founder of record label Fly America
Scrapper Blackwell, blues musician and songwriter, writer of the earliest version of "Sweet Home Chicago"
Darrell Clanton, singer
Dorian, hip-hop recording artist and music producer 
Kenneth "Babyface" Edmonds, R&B music producer/performer
Guitar Pete Franklin, blues musician
Jan Garber, bandleader
Blind Leroy Garnett, boogie-woogie and ragtime pianist and songwriter
Billy Henderson, singer, member of The Spinners (American group)
John Hiatt, musician
Freddie Hubbard, jazz trumpeter
J. J. Johnson, jazz trombonist
Josh Kaufman, singer-songwriter, contestant on The Voice (U.S. Season 6)
Adam Lambert, singer, runner-up of American Idol (Season 8)
Adrianne Lenker, musician, singer songwriter of the indie band, Big Thief
Ted Leo, musician
Charles Scott Leonard, member of the a cappella group Rockapella
Margot & the Nuclear So and So's, indie rock band formed in Indianapolis
Tim McIlrath, musician
Wes Montgomery, jazz guitarist
Plumb, singer/songwriter
 Hal Rayle, voice artist
Larry Ridley, jazz bassist
June Rochelle, singer/songwriter
David Michael Schuster, opera singer
George Shirley, operatic tenor
Noble Sissle, composer
Tiara Thomas, singer-songwriter
Albert Von Tilzer, composer, notably "Take Me Out to the Ball Game"
Pharez Whitted, jazz trumpeter 
Keke Wyatt, R&B singer

Politicians 
 James Bingham, Indiana Attorney General (1907–1911)
 Maria Cantwell, U.S. Senator from Washington
 Paul Cantwell, Indiana state representative
 André Carson, member of the U.S. House of Representatives for Indiana, second Muslim to be elected to the U.S. Congress (2008)
 Julia Carson, member of the U.S. House of Representatives for Indiana; grandmother of André Carson 
 Harriette Bailey Conn, state representative and the first African American to serve as Indiana's state public defender
 Ray Crowe, basketball coach and politician
 John J. Dillon, Indiana Attorney General (1965-1969)
 Charles W. Fairbanks, 26th Vice President of the United States (1905–1909)
 William T. Francis, United States Ambassador to Liberia (1927–1929)
 Benjamin Harrison, 23rd President of the United States (1889–1893); lived and died in Indianapolis
 Thomas A. Hendricks, 21st Vice President of the United States (1863–1869)
 Eric Holcomb, Governor of Indiana
 William A. Ketcham, Indiana Attorney General (1894–1898), Commander-in-Chief of the Grand Army of the Republic (1920–1921).
 Jon Krahulik, Justice of the Indiana Supreme Court (1990–1993)
 Daisy Riley Lloyd, first female African American to serve in the Indiana legislature 
 Richard Lugar, U.S. Senator from Indiana
 Frank E. McKinney, Democratic Party chairman
 Dan Quayle, 44th Vice President of the United States (1989–1993)
 Charles Ray, Justice of the Indiana Supreme Court (1865–1871)
 Edwin K. Steers, Indiana Attorney General (1953–1965)
 Ted Stevens, former U.S. Senator from Alaska
 Mark Warner, U.S. Senator from Virginia
 Mike Pence, 48th Vice President of the United States (2017–2021)

Writers 
 Margaret C. Anderson, critic, editor and publisher
 John David Anderson (1975– ), children's book author of Ms. Bixby's Last Day, 2017 Indiana Authors Award Winner
 Allan Bloom, philosopher and essayist
 A'Lelia Bundles (1952– ), TV producer, journalist, and author of On Her Own Ground: The Life and Times of Madam C.J. Walker
 Jared Carter (1939– ), poet, author of Work, for the Night Is Coming (1981), and winner of the Walt Whitman Award and the Poets' Prize.
 Matt Dellinger (1975– ), author of Interstate 69: The Unfinished History of the Last Great American Highway
 Mari Evans (1923–2017), poet, author of I Am a Black Woman (1970), winner of the Black Academy of Arts and Letters poetry award
 Janet Flanner, Paris correspondent of The New Yorker
Hildegarde Flanner, poet
John Green, children's book award-winning author of The Fault in Our Stars; vlogger
 Alex Hall, author of Ben Drowned (2010)
 Joseph Hayes, author
 Phillip Hoose (1947– ), award-winning children's book author of Claudette Colvin: Twice Toward Justice
 Kathryn Lasky (1944– ), children's book author of Guardians of Ga'Hoole
Charles Major, author
Elizabeth Miller (1878–1961), novelist
Bill Peet (1915–2002), children's book author and illustrator of Pamela Camel, 
Madelyn Pugh, script-writer I Love Lucy television program
Booth Tarkington, Pulitzer Prize-winning author
Kurt Vonnegut, author
James Whitcomb Riley, poet

Other 
 Frank J. Anderson, former Sheriff of Marion County, Indiana (2003–2011)
 Herb Baumeister, suspected serial killer 
 Kent Brantly, physician, author, speaker, first American to be treated for the Ebola virus in 2014, TIME Person of the Year 2014 
 Emmett I. Brown Jr., professional photographer, documented Indiana Avenue's jazz scene in the 1940s and 50s, editor Sepia magazine
 John P. Donohue, professor, doctor, pioneered treatments for testicular cancer
 John Dillinger, bank robber
 Jared Fogle, Subway restaurant endorser, motivational speaker, and convicted child pornographer
 Ruth M. Gardiner, first nurse killed in action during World War II
 Michael Graves, architect
 Margaret Yandes Holliday, Presbyterian missionary in Tabriz from 1883 to 1919
 Peter Kassig, aid worker, taken hostage and ultimately beheaded by The Islamic State
 Justin Knapp, Wikipedia editor
 John Morton-Finney, Buffalo soldier, lawyer, educator and civil rights leader
 Irvine Page, physiologist, former president of the American Heart Association (1956–1957)
 John C. Rule, historian at Ohio State University
 Bill Shirk, escape artist, president of Hoosier Broadcasting Corp.
 Avriel Shull, architect
 William V. Wheeler, founder of Wheeler Mission Ministries of Indianapolis
 David A. Wolf, astronaut
 Evans Woollen III, architect, founder and principal of Woollen, Molzan and Partners

References

 

Indianapolis